Mount Paine is a massive, flat-topped mountain, 3,330 m, forming a buttress-type projection of the western part of the La Gorce Mountains, in the Queen Maud Mountains of Antarctica. Discovered in December 1934 by the Byrd Antarctic Expedition geological party under Quin Blackburn, and named by Byrd for Stuart D.L. Paine, navigator and radio operator of that party.

Mountains of Marie Byrd Land